Uzan (also Romanized as Ūzān and Oozan; also known as Ozan) is a village in Minjavan-e Gharbi Rural District, Minjavan District, Khoda Afarin County, East Azerbaijan Province, Iran. At the 2006 census, its population was 308, in 66 families.

References 

Populated places in Khoda Afarin County